The Baby Namboos were a 1990s British trip hop band. One of their members, Mark Porter, is the cousin of Tricky, whose label imprint 'Durban Poison' released their debut album (the first non-Tricky release). Tricky also contributed vocals to three tracks.

Their song "Late Night Antics" inspired a New Jersey rock band to call themselves Mister Behavior, a persona mentioned in the song.

Members
Julian Brooke
Leo Coleing
Mark Porter
Claude Wiliams
Aurora Borealis (Zoe Bedeaux)

Discography

Albums
 Ancoats 2 Zambia (1999)

References

External links

Trip hop groups
Musical groups from Bristol